The 2012–13 Campbell Fighting Camels basketball team represented Campbell University during the 2012–13 NCAA Division I men's basketball season. The Fighting Camels, led by tenth year head coach Robbie Laing, played their home games at the John W. Pope, Jr. Convocation Center and were members of the North Division of the Big South Conference. They finished the season 13–20, 7–9 in Big South play to finish tied for third place in the North Division. They lost in the quarterfinals of the Big South tournament to Gardner–Webb.

Following the season, head coach Robbie Laing was fired. He posted a record of 113–182 in ten seasons.

Roster

Schedule

|-
!colspan=9| Exhibition

|-
!colspan=9| Regular season

|-
!colspan=9| 2013 Big South Conference men's basketball tournament

References

Campbell Fighting Camels basketball seasons
Campbell
Camp
Camp